University Textbook of Botany was a widely used botany textbook published in 1902 and mostly written and illustrated by Douglas Houghton Campbell.

References

Botany books